The American Peace Centenary Committee was formed during the 1909 centennial of Abraham Lincoln's birth. In 1913, they made the decision to mark the anniversary of the ratification of the Treaty of Ghent in 1915 which ended the War of 1812.

Members

British
Arthur Conan Doyle, honorary member
Earl Gray, president

American
William Bailey Howland
John Aikman Stewart, chairman

Publications
General prospectus of the project to celebrate the centenary of the signing of the Treaty of Ghent, which established lasting peace between America and Great Britain; as well as the plan to signalize in fitting manner, the peace which has existed between the United States, Great Britain and other nations

References

Peace organizations based in the United States